Gil Grand (born Gilles Lagrandeur, January 8, 1968) is a Canadian country music singer. Since 1998, he has released three studio albums: Famous First Words (1998), Burnin (2002) and Somebody's Someone (2006). He has charted several singles on the Canadian country singles charts as well, including the RPM top ten single "Famous First Words" in 1998.

Career
In 1998, Grand signed a record deal with Monument Records' Nashville division. His debut album, Famous First Words, helped him receive three Canadian Country Music Awards nominations including Male Vocalist of the Year, Album of the Year and Wrangler Rising Star.

Burnin was released in December 2002. "Cry A Little," "Break It to Them Gently," "Run" and the title track were all released as singles. Grand earned five CCMA nominations in 2003 including Single of the Year, SOCAN Song of the Year, Video of the Year, and Best Album Graphics, and won Independent Male Artist of the Year.

He released his third album, Somebody's Someone, in March 2006. In 2006, Grand and his younger brother Jake joined forces for Raise the Roof, a tour that took them from British Columbia to Ontario, raising awareness of Ronald McDonald House Charities. Grand now lives in Nashville where he is co-owner and president of Grand & Gee Music Group.

Discography
Studio albums
{| class="wikitable plainrowheaders" style="text-align:center;"
|-
! rowspan="2" style="width:14em;"| Title
! rowspan="2" style="width:20em;"| Details
! Peak positions
|- style="font-size:smaller;"
! width="65"| CAN Country
|-
! scope="row"| Famous First Words
| 
 Release date: September 22, 1998
 Label: Monument Records
| 22
|-
! scope="row"| Burnin| 
 Release date: November 19, 2002
 Label: Royalty Records
| ×
|-
! scope="row"| Somebody's Someone
| 
 Release date: February 28, 2006
 Label: Royalty Records
| ×
|-
| colspan="4" style="font-size:8pt"| "×" indicates that no relevant chart existed or was archived
|}Singles{| class="wikitable plainrowheaders" style="text-align:center;"
|-
! rowspan="2"| Year
! rowspan="2" style="width:18em;"| Single
! colspan="2"| Peak positions
! rowspan="2"| Album
|- style="font-size:smaller;"
! width="45"| CAN Country
! width="45"| US Country
|- 
| rowspan="3"| 1998
! scope="row"| "Famous First Words"
| 6
| 73
| rowspan="6"| Famous First Words
|- 
! scope="row"| "Spilled Perfume"
| —
| —
|-
! scope="row"| "Let's Start Livin'"
| 17
| 55
|-  
| rowspan="2"| 1999
! scope="row"| "I Can't Put Your Memory to Bed"
| 26
| —
|- 
! scope="row"| "I Already Fell"
| 19
| 70
|-  
| 2000
! scope="row"| "Love Me or Not (Here I Come)"
| —
| —
|- 
| 2001
! scope="row"| "There She Goes"
| ×
| —
| rowspan="7"| ''Burnin
|- 
| 2002
! scope="row"| "Cry a Little"
| ×
| —
|- 
| rowspan="2"| 2003
! scope="row"| "Break It to Them Gently"
| ×
| —
|- 
! scope="row"| "Run"
| ×
| —
|- 
| rowspan="3"| 2004
! scope="row"| "Burnin'"
| 16
| —
|- 
! scope="row"| "Never Comin' Down"
| 15
| —
|- 
! scope="row"| "Sometimes She Cries"
| —
| —
|- 
| 2005
! scope="row"| "These Wheels Won't Roll"
| —
| —
| rowspan="5"| Somebody's Someone|- 
| rowspan="3"| 2006
! scope="row"| "Quit Teasin' Me"
| 21
| —
|- 
! scope="row"| "Never Saw Her Leavin' Comin'"
| 43
| —
|- 
! scope="row"| "Somebody's Someone"
| 48
| —
|- 
| 2007
! scope="row"| "Good Days, Bad Days"
| —
| —
|-
| 2012
! scope="row"| "Baby Knows a Lot About Leavin'"
| 33
| —
| rowspan="3" 
|-
| 2014
! scope="row"| "Groove"
| —
| —
|-
| 2016
! scope="row"| "She'll Always Be Mine"
| —
| —
|-
| colspan="5" style="font-size:8pt"| "—" denotes releases that did not chart"×" indicates that no relevant chart existed or was archived
|}

Note

Music videos

Awards and nominations
1998
 RPM Male Vocalist of the Year

1999
 CCMA Album of the Year, Famous First Words''
 CCMA Male Vocalist of the Year
 CCMA Wrangler Rising Star

2003
 CCMA Independent Male Artist of the Year
 CCMA Single of the Year, "Cry A Little"
 CCMA SOCAN Song of the Year, "Cry A Little"
 CCMA Video of the Year, "Cry A Little"

2004
 CCMA Video of the Year, "Run"
 CCMA Independent Male Artist of the Year

2006
 CCMA Record Producer of the Year

References

1968 births
Canadian male singer-songwriters
Canadian country singer-songwriters
Franco-Ontarian people
Living people
Musicians from Greater Sudbury